Kennebecasis can mean:

New Brunswick, Canada 
 Kennebecasis Island, an island within the Canadian province of New Brunswick
 Kennebecasis River, a river in New Brunswick.
 Kennebecasis Valley, a region around the Kennebecasis River
 Kennebecasis Valley High School
 Kennebecasis (electoral district), a riding that elects members to the Legislative Assembly of New Brunswick
 Kennebecasis Regional Police Force, a police branch serving the Kennebecasis region.

Other 
 Kanabicases Adventurers Society, also known as R.K.A.S., a guild of privateers formed during the late Eighteenth century